The 2015–16 New Mexico State Aggies men's basketball team represented New Mexico State University during the 2015–16 NCAA Division I men's basketball season. The Aggies, led by ninth year head coach Marvin Menzies, played their home games at the Pan American Center in Las Cruces, New Mexico and were members of the Western Athletic Conference. They finished the season 23–11, 13–1 in WAC play to win the WAC regular season championship. They defeated UMKC to advance to the championship game of the WAC tournament where they lost to Cal State Bakersfield. As a regular season conference champion who failed to win their conference tournament, they received an automatic bid to the National Invitation Tournament where they lost in the first round to Saint Mary's.

On April 16, 2016, head coach Marvin Menzies left the school to accept the head coaching position at UNLV. On April 26, the school hired Paul Weir, an assistant coach under Menzies, as head coach.

Previous season 
The Aggies finished the 2014–15 season with an overall record 23–11, 13–1 in WAC play to win the regular season WAC championship. They defeated Cal State Bakersfield and Seattle to be champions of the WAC tournament. They received an automatic bid to the NCAA tournament where they lost in the second round to Kansas.

Departures

2015 Recruiting Class

Roster

Schedule

|-
!colspan=9 style=| Exhibition

|-
!colspan=9 style=| Regular season

|-
!colspan=9 style=| WAC tournament

|-
!colspan=9 style=| NIT

References

New Mexico State Aggies men's basketball seasons
New Mexico State
New Mexico State
Aggies
Aggies